Big Bow is an unincorporated community in Stanton County, Kansas, United States.  As of the 2020 census, the population of the community and nearby areas was 32.

History
The first post office in Big Bow was established February 17, 1925, and was discontinued June 2, 1981.

Demographics

For statistical purposes, the United States Census Bureau has defined Big Bow as a census-designated place (CDP).

References

Further reading

External links
 Stanton County maps: Current, Historic, KDOT

Unincorporated communities in Stanton County, Kansas
Unincorporated communities in Kansas